Mayong may refer to:

 Mayong, Dongguan, China
 Mayong (Assam), India
 Mayong, a district in Jepara Regency, Central Java, Indonesia
 Ma-yong (Bouea macrophylla), a tropical fruit tree native to Southeast Asia

See also
 Mayon (disambiguation)